Holy shit may refer to:

 Holy Shit (band), a 2000s indie rock band formed by Matt Fishbeck and Ariel Pink
 Holy Shit (album), a 2011 album by Living with Lions
 "Holy Shit", a song by Father John Misty, appearing his 2015 album I Love You, Honeybear
 "Holy Shit!", a song by Against Me!, appearing on its 2005 album Searching for a Former Clarity
 Holy Shit (You've Got to Vote), a 2016 video by Rachel Bloom
 "Holy shit", a vulgar variant of the "holy cow" expression
 "Holy shit", a jocular translation by art historian Cecila Klein of the divine excrement offered in the rites of Aztec goddess Tlazolteotl
 Holy Shit, a 2010 book by Gene Logsdon on the importance of manure in gardening

English phrases